Renato Augusto (Renato Soares de Oliveira Augusto, born 1988) is a Brazilian football midfielder for Corinthians and the Brazil national team.

Renato Augusto may also refer to:

Renato Augusto (footballer, born 1990) (Renato Augusto de Assis Pinto), Brazilian former football midfielder
Renato Augusto (footballer, born 1992) (Renato Augusto Santos Júnior), Brazilian football midfielder